Pistolero is a single released by trance band Juno Reactor, taken from their fifth album Shango, released in 1998.

The song opens with Spanish acoustic guitar and a female voice saying, "I hate robbing banks" followed by a blast of gun fire that introduces the beat.

"Pistolero" was done in a collaboration between Ben Watkins and Steve Stevens, guitarist for Billy Idol. The song opened up an entirely new direction for Juno Reactor.

Trivia

The voice sample used at the beginning of the song, "I hate robbing banks", was said by Anne Baxter in the 1966 Batman episode "Zelda the Great".

Pistolero was featured during the trailer for the movie Once Upon a Time in Mexico as well as the film itself and was subsequently included on the film's soundtrack. It also featured in Jet Moto 3 and Sugar & Spice and is the background music of the Israeli TV Spanish Football League matches.

CD single

Track Listing
 Pistolero (Radio Edit) 3:22
 Pistolero (Juno Reactor Mix) 6:18
 Pistolero (Fluke "Hang 'Em High" Remix) 5:20
 Pistolero (Headrillaz "Sandinista" Remix) 6:50
 Pistolero (Man With No Name Remix) 6:30
 Pistolero (Picture of Man Remix) 6:49
 Pistolero (Tarantino Radio Mix) 3:37
 Pistolero (Astrix Remix) 7:06

References

Electronic songs
Trance songs
1999 songs
Songs written by Steve Stevens
Songs written by Ben Watkins